Erik Balnuweit (born 21 September 1988 in Gera) is a German hurdler. He competed in the 110 m hurdles event at the 2012 Summer Olympics failing to reach the semifinals.

He has personal bests of 13.44 in the 110 metres hurdles (2013) and 7.54 in the indoor 60 metres hurdles (2014).

Competition record

References

External links 

 
 

1988 births
Living people
Sportspeople from Gera
People from Bezirk Gera
German male hurdlers
Olympic athletes of Germany
Athletes (track and field) at the 2012 Summer Olympics
Competitors at the 2013 Summer Universiade